Andrew Lyght (21 July 1956 – 16 April 2001) was a Guyanese cricketer. He played in 38 first-class and 17 List A matches for Guyana from 1976 to 1988.

Career 
He played for the Demerara Cricket Club, Guyana's Under-19, West Indies Under-19, Demerara County, Guyana, and the Guyana National XI. He played for five years in the English County leagues during the 1980s. He was given the nickname "Monster" due to "his appetite for batting and how difficult it was to get him out".

Lyght was diagnosed with a localized malignant tumor in the mid-90's. The tumor was removed, but a few years later, it was discovered that the cancer had spread to other parts of his body. After various treatments in England, he returned to Guyana. He adopted a Rastafarian lifestyle in his battle against cancer. He succumbed to the disease in 2001.

Legacy 
In 2012, a commemorative game was played in Lyght's honor, as charity event organized by Friends of Former Guyana Cricketers. Proceeds of the event were given to Lyght's son Andrew Lyght Jr and his daughter Andrea.

In New York, A memorial cup was held in his honor 2017 and 2018. The teams of the New York District Metropolitan Cricket Association league,  Atlantis Cricket Club and Sheffield Cricket Club share social ties to Demerara Cricket Club and Malteenoes Sports Club in Guyana.

Lyght's nephew, Christopher Barnwell, also plays for Guyana and the West Indies cricket team. Lyght's cousin William Whyte is an ex-Guyana all-rounder.

See also
 List of Guyanese representative cricketers

References

1956 births
2001 deaths
Guyanese cricketers
Guyana cricketers
Sportspeople from Georgetown, Guyana